Padma Gole (1913–1998) was a Marathi poet from Maharashtra, India born in patwardhan family of Tasgaon (District Sangli). She was one of the many women from rich Indian families who were emboldened by the Gandhian movement to become feminist writers. Her poetry was heavily influenced by the writings of Ram Ganesh Gadkari, Tryambak Bapuji Thombre, and Yashwant Dinkar Pendharkar. Much of Padma's poetry depicts the domestic lives of Indian middle-class women.

The following are the collections of her poems:
 Akashwedi (आकाशवेडी)
 Shrawan Megh (श्रावणमेघ)
 Pritipathawar (प्रीतिपथावर)
 Nihar ( निहार)
 Swapnata (स्वप्नता)
 Sakal

Personal life
Gole was second child of Shrimant Vinayakrao alias Babasaheb Patwardhan and Shrimant Saraswatibai Patwardhan.  After Vinayakrao's death in 1923, her mother took all their children to Pune where all siblings took their education. Ms Gole had four siblings Shrimant Kamlini alias Taisaheb Peshawa (1911–1973), Parshuram Vinayakrao Patwardhan (1917–1989), Mangalmurti Vinayakrao alias Bhaiyyasaheb Patwardhan (1920–1980) and Kamalatai Bhave, Jabalpur/Mumbai.

References

1913 births
1998 deaths
20th-century Indian poets
Indian feminist writers
Indian feminists
Marathi-language writers
Indian women poets
20th-century Indian women writers
Poets from Maharashtra
People from Sangli district
Women writers from Maharashtra